Zdenko Baotić (born March 9, 1985) is a Bosnian retired football goalkeeper.

Club career
Baotić's first club was HNK Orašje, but after several seasons with the Swans (as they are also known), he decided to go on and play for some bigger club. He signed a four-year-contract with FK Željezničar playing in Bosnian Premier League.  In January 2009, he signed with Sturm Graz.

After good performances at SK Sturm Graz, on June 23, 2009, he signed a 4-year deal with the Romanian club Oțelul Galați .

International career
In autumn of 2007, he was called up by Bosnian national team head coach Fuad Muzurović.

References

External links

Official site
Profile - Austrian Bundesliga

1985 births
Living people
People from Gradačac
Association football goalkeepers
Bosnia and Herzegovina footballers
HNK Orašje players
FK Željezničar Sarajevo players
SK Sturm Graz players
ASC Oțelul Galați players
Premier League of Bosnia and Herzegovina players
Liga I players
Bosnia and Herzegovina expatriate footballers
Expatriate footballers in Austria
Bosnia and Herzegovina expatriate sportspeople in Austria
Expatriate footballers in Romania
Bosnia and Herzegovina expatriate sportspeople in Romania